Carex trichodes is a tussock-forming species of perennial sedge in the family Cyperaceae. It is native to southern parts of South America.

See also
List of Carex species

References

trichodes
Plants described in 1875
Taxa named by Ernst Gottlieb von Steudel
Flora of Chile
Flora of Argentina